The First United Methodist Church is a historic church building in Fordyce, Arkansas.  The two story brick building was designed by John Parks Almand and built in 1925.  The Arts and Crafts style building presents a long facade to East 4th Street, with its main entry separating the sanctuary to the right and a wing of offices and Sunday School classrooms to the left.  It was the second church for a congregation established c. 1883; the first was destroyed by fire in 1922.

The building was listed on the National Register of Historic Places in 1983.

See also
National Register of Historic Places listings in Dallas County, Arkansas

References

Churches on the National Register of Historic Places in Arkansas
Churches completed in 1925
Churches in Dallas County, Arkansas
United Methodist churches in Arkansas
Buildings and structures in Fordyce, Arkansas
National Register of Historic Places in Dallas County, Arkansas